Gordon Haskell (27 April 1946 – 15 October 2020) was an English musician and songwriter. A pop, rock, jazz, country and blues vocalist, guitarist, and bassist, he was a school friend of King Crimson guitarist Robert Fripp. The two first worked together in Fripp's mid-1960s teenage group the League of Gentlemen (not to be confused with Fripp's later new wave band). 

Haskell gained recognition as bass player for the Fleur de Lys in 1966, and subsequently spent a short period in King Crimson. He sang on the album In the Wake of Poseidon (1970), and sang and played bass on Lizard (1971). After leaving King Crimson, Haskell continued as a solo musician, reaching international fame in 2001 with his hit "How Wonderful You Are" and the platinum-selling album Harry's Bar.

1960s
During the late 1960s Haskell moved from Dorset to London (for a brief period, sharing a flat with Jimi Hendrix). While playing bass in the psychedelic pop band the Fleur De Lys, who were hired by Atlantic Records as a full-time session band, Haskell recorded a few singles with the group to minimal success but achieving a No 1 and No 3 in South Africa and Australia as a songwriter with his song "Lazy Life". During the two years at Atlantic he worked with Isaac Hayes and David Porter (who wrote many songs for the Atlantic stable, including Sam and Dave) and worked with a variety of producers namely Glyn Johns, Donnie Elbert, Arif Mardin and George Martin. His debut solo album Sail in My Boat was recorded for the U.K. division of CBS Records in 1969 but the album did not chart. A song from the album, Zanzibar, was covered by Wanda Arletti, and reached No 1 on the singles chart in South Africa.

1970s
When King Crimson parted company with original singer Greg Lake, Haskell was asked to be the bassist and vocalist in the transitional King Crimson line-up of 1970. He appeared on the albums In the Wake of Poseidon (although just for one song, Cadence and Cascade) and Lizard. However, Haskell's preference for Nat King Cole and Ray Charles songs led to frustration in Fripp's band, and his folk and blues-oriented interests were in conflict with Crimson's more complicated progressive rock musical style. Haskell left the band acrimoniously following the recording of Lizard, during rehearsals for planned live work. He objected to his vocal contributions being manipulated, using distortion and by being sped up, feeling it would damage his reputation.

Haskell subsequently auditioned for Atlantic Records head Ahmet Ertegün, who had signed Ray Charles and Aretha Franklin which led to Arif Mardin producing Haskell's 1971 solo album It Is and It Isn’t. The album has guest appearances from top session musicians, notably John Wetton, who would join King Crimson in late 1972. Again, the album was not a commercial success. As the 1970s progressed, Haskell found himself playing supporting stints with Cliff Richard and Tim Hardin. For a short time in 1974 he rehearsed with the group Stackridge. Though Haskell decided not to join the group, Stackridge did record a song from It Is and It Isn’t. Originally called "Worms", the version on the 1975 album Extravaganza was re-titled, "No One's More Important Than the Earthworm".

1980s and 1990s
Haskell arrived at the doorstep of the 1980s deeply in debt and dissatisfied with the music business.  He left for Denmark in 1984, playing "seven nights a week to drunks in bars." During this time his voice became a lot stronger. His debt eventually eliminated, he returned to England and continued playing solo and small-band gigs in tiny pubs and clubs. "I was trapped," Haskell recalls, "but the time wasn't wasted. I was practising. I was in the wilderness for a long time. But I met a lot of really interesting characters in bars, and that's where my songs tend to come from. I was self-contained, self-supporting, and I didn't really have anything to do with the recording industry."

His single "Almost Certainly" Covered by Judy Boucher  reached number one in South Africa in 1990. An album called Hambledon Hill followed. It did well on airplay with BBC Radio 1's DJ, Bob Harris saying he "loved it" and become record of the week in BBC radio Scotland . A single of the same name was planned but the distributor went bankrupt and the deal fell through. However, in 1994, the Voiceprint record label re-issued the album.

Success
After releasing the album Butterfly in China in (1996), he then did a small tour of America which delighted King Crimson fans even though he was only there to do solo material and see if he could get a record deal. This never happened and he went back to England to continue performing in bars. He then became introduced to Robbie Mcintosh by Ken Watkins about performing together.  This is where he released All in The Scheme of Things (2000). Seeing an opportunity, he was approached by manager of Robbie McIntosh, Ian Brown about recording opportunities. Haskell accepted, but specified that he wanted to make his record the old-fashioned way: live, no overdubs, and grounded in solid songwriting and classically styled performances.

The album that was made in February 2001,  called Look Out contained a jazz-tinged ballad entitled "How Wonderful You Are". After being sent on tour with Hamish Stuart  & Robbie Mcintosh  to Germany in June 2001. Look Out was released to no or little press.  Gordon thought otherwise and so the Song "How Wonderful You Are"  was given to Johnnie Walker of BBC Radio 2 the day before 9/11.  Even before its release as a single in late 2001, Haskell's song surpassed the Beatles’ "Hey Jude" and Frank Sinatra's "My Way" to become the most-requested song on BBC Radio 2. Despite limited promotion, it charted as the Christmas number two in the UK Singles Chart. Although appearing on Top of the Pops that week, the broadcast was delayed for 14 months due to pressure from EMI Records, Robbie Williams' Management (David Enthoven who had managed him in King Crimson) and the City of London Bank who were arranging a 42 million pound deal with Williams. It is generally accepted that had he been broadcast he would have taken the No 1 from Williams and no explanation or apology was ever given by the BBC Executive Producer. It went on, however, to sell more than 400,000 copies.

As "How Wonderful You Are" scaled the UK singles chart, the British press began to pay attention to the story of its unsung creator. Haskell was quoted as saying, "Suddenly, after all these years, there's all this attention. But I've been living on skid row for so long that if I make a million now, it's back pay."
As a result of the success of the single Haskell was offered a multimillion-dollar recording contract from the UK label East West Records, distributed by Warner Bros. Records. The album Harry's Bar was released on 7 January 2002. It peaked at number 2 in the UK Albums Chart, and found similar success in Europe.  Later on that year Shadows on the Wall was released, but only made Number 44 in the UK Albums Chart. Warner Bros fired him when he called the MD an android in a music magazine and cancelled his contract. Haskell has no regrets. He stated that it was not he who signed to Warners but his manager, who signed himself instead, so felt there was no loss as the whole thing was a fabrication. He merely stated the truth, something that continued to serve him well in his later years as he continued to tour and write and record.

His next album reached number 14 on the Polish album charts.  Called The Lady Wants to Know, it contained eleven tracks, was produced by Hamish Stuart and featured Tony O'Malley and Robbie McIntosh. A DVD, "The Road To Harry's Bar", was released in 2005 and Haskell also published his autobiography under the same title, with the foreword written by David Nobbs, creator of The Fall and Rise of Reginald Perrin.

After commuting from the Greek island of Skopelos for eight years he returned to the UK in 2017 for a British tour with Hannah's Yard, and planned to continue touring and recording as and when he chose. He was a resident of the UK.

Death 
Haskell died from cancer on 15 October 2020 at the age of 74. His death was announced on 18 October through his Facebook page, and confirmed via his agent's website the following day.

Discography

Fleurs De Lys 
Singles : The singles noted here only include those with Gordon Haskell as bassist and singer :
 1966 : "Circles" / "So Come On" - Immediate Records IM 32
 1966 : "Mud In Your Eye" / "I've Been Trying" - Polydor Records 56124
 1967 : "I Can See The Light" / "Prodigal Son" - Polydor Records 56200
 1968 : "Gong with the Luminous Nose" / "Hammer Head" - Polydor Records 56251
 1967 : Shyster "Tick Tock" / "That's a Hoe Down" Polydor – 56202

Compilations :
 1996 : Les Fleurs De Lys
 1997 : Reflections - Blueprint Records (4) – BP256CD
 2002 : Les Fleurs De Lys - Reedition of the first compilation album 
 2013 : You've Got To Earn It - Acid Jazz Records AJXLP324

Cupid's Inspiration 
 1968 : " I Want To Give It All To You" Written Song  on Album Yesterday Has Gone and played bass

King Crimson 
 1970 : In the Wake of Poseidon - vocals on "Cadence and Cascade"
 1970 : Lizard - bass and vocals throughout, except for "Prince Rupert Awakes" (sung by Jon Anderson)

Joe 
 1977 Minoru Muraoka And His Group with Joe (188) – Memories Of Chi Yo 
 1978 Joe - How Can  I Resist/ Sweet Annabelle (Written both Songs and played bass)

Solo

Studio albums

Singles

EPs

Live albums

Compilation albums

Video albums

Collaboration 
 1991 : Ophelia's Shadow by Toyah Willcox - keyboards on the title track. Robert Fripp also played guitar on the album.

Covers of Gordon Haskell Songs 
 "You Won't Be seeing Me anymore" - B side   Sad Simon Lives Again sung by Tim Andrews   
 "Lazy Life" on the album Sad Simon Lives Again  by Quentin E. Klopjaeger with the Gonks  No 1 South Africa 21-06-1968
 "Lazy Life" on the album Lazy Life / Crazy How Love Slips Away  by William Kimber
 "Lazy Life" on the album Four Jacks And A Jill – The Sunny Side Of Four Jacks And A Jill
 "Lazy Life" on the album Backstreet.... And Other Great Hits! by The Oulet
 "Lazy Life" on the album Heart 'N' Soul – Lazy Life (single) No 4   Australia 
 "Zanzibar" on the album Zanzibar Single by Wanda Arletti No 2 in South Africa 01 -01- 1971. Sold £100,000 copies  
 "Worms" on the album Extravaganza by Stackridge.
 "Almost Certainly" on the album Almost Certainly by Judy Boucher. No 1 in South Africa (1990)
 "Voodoo Dance" on the album Oh! by Tony O' Malley.
 "I Can See the Light" on the album Childhood's End by Ulver.
 "Lazy Life" on the album ...At His Best (1984)  by Billy Fury.
 "Freeway to Her Dreams" on the Single  Freeway To Her Dreams by [[Cathryn Craig & Brian Willoughby ]].
 "Whole Wide World " on the Single   Whole Wide World by Cathryn Craig & Brian Willoughby Featuring Righteous Brother Bill Medley.

Book 
 The Road to Harry's Bar: Forty Years on the Potholed Path to Stardom, 2006, Mainstream Publishing, 
 " The Importance of Salmon " Gordon Haskell (Author) Sue Haskell (Illustrator) Self Published  14 June 2019

References

External links
 Official Gordon Haskell Website
  Gordon Haskell My space Website
 
 "You learn more on a bumpy road", article about Gordon Haskell from Times Online

1946 births
2020 deaths
English people of Greek descent
King Crimson members
Musicians from Bournemouth
English bass guitarists
English male guitarists
English male singer-songwriters
English record producers
English songwriters
Male bass guitarists
Atco Records artists
East West Records artists
Voiceprint Records artists